Bronx High School for Writing and Communication Arts is a public high school located in the New York City borough of The Bronx. The school is collocated with five other high schools on the Evander Childs Educational Campus.

History
The school opened with a 9th-grade class in fall 2004 under Principal Steven Chernigoff. A grade level was added each year until 9th through 12th grades were offered in 2007.

Student population
According to the NYC Department of Education, as of March 2011, the school had a total enrollment of 417 students, of which 60% were girls and 40% were boys. 6.47% of the students were English-language learners.

Course Offerings
Partly due to the small size of the school, it only offers a minimal number of classes.
Mathematics: Algebra, Math A, Math B
Science: Living Environment, Earth Science, Chemistry
History: U.S History, Global History, Economics
Foreign Language: Spanish (The choice is not optional)
English: English 1–8, Journalism, English workshops
Physical Education and Health
Art
Technology

Partnership
The school maintains a partnership with Epic Theater Center, a New York City-based theatrical company that also produces education programs.

See also
List of high schools in New York City

References
Notes

External links
NYC Department of Education: Bronx High School for Writing and Communication Arts

Educational institutions established in 2004
Public high schools in the Bronx
2004 establishments in New York City